Zinc finger protein ZFPM2, i.e. zinc finger protein, FOG family member 2, but also termed Friend of GATA2, Friend of GATA-2, FOG2, or FOG-2, is a protein that in humans is encoded by the ZFPM2 and in mice by the Zfpm2 gene.

The zinc finger-containing protein encoded by this gene is a widely expressed member of the FOG family of regulators of transcription factors. The family consists of the ZFPM1 and ZFPM2 genes in humans and Zfpm1 and Zfpm2 genes in mice. Its members may act as coactivators and/or corepressors to modulate the activity of GATA transcription factors. That is, the ZFPM2 protein appears able to interact directly with and thereby either enhance or repress the ability of GATA transcription factors to stimulate the expression of their target genes; the direction of ZFPM2's actions depends on the contexts of the promoter sections of the various GATA target genes.

The ZFPM2 protein interacts primarily with the GATA4 but also with GATA2, GATA5, and GATA6 transcription factors. ZFPM2 protein's interaction with GATA4 is notable for controlling the embryonic development of various tissues, particularly the heart, diaphragm, and gonads. Correspondingly, ZFPM2 mutations are responsible for certain forms of congenital heart defects, congenital diaphragmatic hernias, and ambiguous genitalia in mice as well as humans.

Gene 
The ZFPM2 gene is found in a wide range of animal species from flies to humans. The human gene is located on the long or "q" arm of chromosome 8 at position 23.1 (i.e. 8q23.1) and consists of 9 exons. The equivalent mouse gene, Zfpm2, is located on chromosome 15 and consists of 8 exons. Knockout of ZFPM2 is embryonic lethal in mice, with mice dying at embryonic day 12.5-15.5 due to congenital cardiac defects (thin heart ventricular muscle, common atrioventricular canal, and the tetralogy of Fallot malformation. ZFPM2 expression in mice is also required for normal development of the gonads, lung and diaphragm.

Protein 
Both the human and mouse ZFPM2 proteins consists of 1151 amino acids and are expressed in various tissues. The human protein is expressed at relatively high levels in the adult ovary and uterine endometrium while the mouse protein is expressed at relatively high levels in the central nervous system cerebellum and, during the early stages of its development, the heart. Human ZFPM2 contains 8 zinc finger structural motifs and interacts directly with various members of the GATA transcription factor family to modify their ability to stimulate the expression of their target genes. For example, it has been shown to bind directly with the N-terminal zinc finger of the GATA4 transcription factor to inhibit its ability to stimulate the expression of a target gene in an in vitro model system.

The extreme N terminal end of the ZFPM2 protein contains two domains, one of which interacts directly with the Mi-2/NuRD complex (i.e. nucleosome remodeling and histone deacetylase complex or NuRD complex) and other of which binds CTBP1 or CTBP2 proteins. The NuRD complex and the CtBPs are classified as corepressors. that act to promote the ability of ZFPM2 to inhibit the ability of GATA proteins to stimulate the expression of their target genes.

Pathophysiology 
ZFPM2 regulates the expression of certain GATA target genes by up-regulating or down-regulating the ability of the GATA transcription factors, primarily GATA3, GATA4, GATA5, and GATA6, to stimulate the expression of their target genes. Interactions with the NuRD complex or a CTBP can cause ZFPM2 to inhibit the ability of GATA3-6 proteins to stimulate the expression of their target genes.

Clinical relevancy

Congenital heart disease 
Mutations in the ZFPM2 gene are responsible for rare and sporadic cases of congenital heart disease. These include cases of Tetralogy of Fallot, truncus arteriosus, failure to from the pulmonary artery valve combined with ventricular septal defect, double outlet right ventricle, transposition of the great arteries, and interrupted aortic arch. Sporadic cases of Tetralogy of Fallot were also found in cases where the levels of Hypermethylation at CpG sites in the ZFPM2 gene promoter were greatly elevated; these cases were associated with decreases cardiac tissue levels of mRNA for ZFPM2. These cases likely reflect the role of ZFPM2 in promoting GATA4's function in the embryonic development of the heart.

Congenital diaphragmatic hernia 
ZFPM2 heterozygous gene mutations are responsible for sporadic cases of congenital diaphragmatic hernias. This development disorder may be the underlying cause for the development of congenital lung dysplasia and pulmonary vascular disorder that leads to pulmonary hypertension. These defects are considered due to haploinsufficiency in ZFPM2 protein and consequential failure of GATA4 to promote normal lung development.

Sex development 
Heterozygous mutations in the ZFPM2 gene are responsible for sporadic, very rare cases of a familial form of disorders of sex development, ambiguous genitalia. The disorder likely reflects haploinsufficiency of the ZFPM2 protein and consequential reduced regulation of GATA4 in promoting normal development of the gonads.

References

Further reading